Maulana Azad Education Foundation was established to promote education amongst educationally backward sections of the Muslim community of India. It is funded by the Ministry of Minority Affairs, Govt. of India. The Minister of Minority Affairs is ex-officio president of the foundation. The foundation was established on the occasion of Maulana Abul Kalam Azad's birth centenary celebrations in 1989.

At present the foundation is providing the following:

Grant-in-aid for nono-governmental organizations
Maulana Azad National Scholarship for meritorious girls students 
Maulana Azad Memorial Lecture & Awareness Program

Organisation and structure
The governing body of the foundation includes two categories of members:

 Ex-officio members:
 Dr. Najma A. Heptulla (Hon’ble Minister of Minority Affairs)- President
 Smt. Preeti Madan (Joint Secretary to the Govt. of India)
 Prof. Talat Ahmad (Vice-Chancellor, Jamia Millia Islamia)
 Lt. Gen. Zameeruddin Shah (Vice-Chancellor, Aligarh Muslim University)
 Prof. (Dr.) Qamar Rahman (Chairman, Education & Women Welfare Committee of the Central Wakf Council)
 Shri Ali Ahmed Khan Secretary

 Nominated nembers:
 Prof Tahir Hussain, - Vice President
 Shri Imran-ur-Rehman Kidwai- Treasurer
 Shri P. A. Inamdar
 Shri Mujahid S. Khan
 Maulana Mohammad Wali Rahmani
 Shri Akhlaq Ahmed (Former Minister from Bihar)
 Shri Syed Babar Ashraf
 Prof. (Dr.) Nahid Zafar Shaikh
 Shri Syed Shahid Hussain Rizvi

References

Educational organisations based in India
Memorials to Abul Kalam Azad
Minorities-focussed government initiatives in India